Peter Perski (born 6 January 1970 in Stockholm) is a Swedish actor.

Selected filmography
2005 - Kommissionen (TV)
2004 - Eko
2003 - Utan dig
2001 - Rederiet (TV)
2000 - Livet är en schlager
1996 - Jägarna

External links

21st-century Swedish male actors
Swedish Jews
Jewish male actors
Living people
1970 births
Male actors from Stockholm
20th-century Swedish male actors